Eshaq Bazar (also Romanized as Esḩāq Bāzār; also known as E’sḩag Bāzār) is a village in Pir Sohrab Rural District, in the Central District of Chabahar County, Sistan and Baluchestan Province, Iran. At the 2006 census, its population was 724, in 144 families.

References 

Populated places in Chabahar County